Calimero is an animated television series about a charming but hapless anthropomorphized chicken; the only black one in a family of yellow chickens. He wears half of his egg shell still on his head. Calimero originally appeared on the Italian television show Carosello on July 14, 1963, and soon became a popular icon in Italy.

The characters were created by the animation studio Organizzazione Pagot and originated as a series of animated advertisements for Miralanza AVA soap products shown throughout Italy. The creators of the main character were Nino Pagot, Toni Pagot and Ignazio Colnaghi. At the end of each episode, it turns out that Calimero is not actually black, but only very dirty, and becomes white after being washed by the advertised soap products.

The characters were later licensed in Japan as an anime series twice, titled 
. The first was made by Toei Animation and ran from October 15, 1972, to September 30, 1975; the second, with new settings and characters, was made in 1992. Altogether, 99 Japanese episodes were made (47 in the 1972 Toei series, and 52 in the 1992 Toei series). The series mostly consists of the many adventures of Calimero and his friends as they solve mysteries and make documentaries. However, their adventures usually get them into quite a bit of trouble. The second series was never renewed for a second season. English dubbed versions for the first two anime series were never officially released, though dubbed pilot episodes do exist. However, the series did come out in other languages. The original 1970s shorts and the third CGI series were released in English however. The first series was also broadcast on European networks such as TROS (Netherlands and Belgium), ZDF and RTL II (Germany) or TVE (Spain).

A third animation series about the character, in computer animation, premiered in TF1 in 2013. The production team includes France’s Gaumont Animation, rights owner Calidra, Italy’s Studio Campedelli and Japanese partners TV Tokyo and Kodansha. The series also aired on several other TV channels.

Characters

1974 series
 – The hero of the show. 
 – Calimero's girlfriend, a shy bird with common sense. 
 – 
 – 
 – 
 – 
 – 
 –

1992 series
Calimero – 
Priscilla – 
 – 
 – 
 – a wealthy girl duck. 
 – 
 –

2014 series
Calimero - Voiced by: Fanny Bloc (French) / Ayaka Asai (Japanese)
Priscilla -Voiced by: Naïke Fauveau (French) / Rumi Ōkubo (Japanese)
Giuliano (Valeriano in UK English dub)- Voiced by Georges de Vitis (French) / Kokoro Kikuchi (Japanese)
Peter (Pierrot in UK English dub) - Voiced by: Pascal Sellem (French) / Tōru Sakurai (Japanese)
Susie - Voiced by: Ren Kato (Japanese)
Pepe - Voiced by: Tōmoyuki Maruyama (Japanese)

Mobile game
A mobile game titled Calimero's Village was released for iOS and Android in 2015 by BulkyPix.

Impact in popular culture
The main character in the anime series has had a lasting impact in the vocabulary of some countries, either because of his looks, with an egg shell on his head, or because of his frequent complaining about being unfairly treated by others:

 Calimero is the name and subject of a Welsh language song by the band Super Furry Animals
 French singer Brigitte Fontaine collaborated with the band Stereolab on a song of the same name
 In the Netherlands and Belgium, the term "" is used to denote people who are staunchly convinced that their position as an underdog is due to their smaller size, either literally or symbolically, which covers up for their own shortcomings. Often the character's lines from the show are cited, "They are big and I is  small and that is not fair, oh no!" (translated back from Dutch, with intentional error).
 The slang nickname during the 1970s and 1980s for military policemen in the Israeli Army was Calimero, due to their egg-shaped white helmet; the same was the case in Spain, where calimero was also a name for a type of helmet for motorbikers.
 In parts of Yugoslavia, the Polski Fiat 126p was nicknamed Kalimero in reference to the character.
 Italian luxury fashion house Bottega Veneta introduced the "Kalimero" bucket bag in 2022, taking inspiration from the bindle that the character carries.

References

External links
 Official website
 Calimero's first commercial (1963)
 
 

1972 anime television series debuts
1992 anime television series debuts
2013 anime television series debuts
Television series about chickens
Italian children's animated television series
Dutch children's animated television series
British children's animated television shows
Japanese children's animated television series
French children's animated television series
Fictional Italian people
Toei Animation television
TV Asahi original programming
TV Tokyo original programming
YTV (Canadian TV channel) original programming
BBC children's television shows
ITV children's television shows
RTVE shows
Australian Broadcasting Corporation original programming
Eggs in culture